The 2019 ITTF World Tour was the 24th season of the International Table Tennis Federation's professional table tennis world tour.

Schedule

The tournaments in the 2019 tour have been split into two tiers: World Tour Platinum and World Tour. The Platinum events offer higher prize money and more points towards the ITTF World Tour standings, which determine the qualifiers for the ITTF World Tour Grand Finals in December.

Below is the 2019 schedule announced by the International Table Tennis Federation:

Key

Results

Grand Finals

The 2019 ITTF World Tour Grand Finals will take place in Zhengzhou, China, from 12–15 December 2019.

See also
2019 World Table Tennis Championships
2019 ITTF Men's World Cup
2019 ITTF Women's World Cup
2019 ITTF Team World Cup
2019 ITTF Challenge Series

References

External links
International Table Tennis Federation

 
ITTF World Tour
World Tour